Cyrus Wesley Peck  & Bar (26 April 1871 – 27 September 1956) was a Canadian recipient of the Victoria Cross, the highest award for gallantry in the face of the enemy that can be awarded to British and Commonwealth forces. Peck was one of the seven Canadians to be awarded the Victoria Cross for their actions on one single day, 2 September 1918, for actions across the 30 km long Drocourt-Quéant Line near Arras, France. The other six were Bellenden Hutcheson, Arthur George Knight, William Metcalf, Claude Joseph Patrick Nunney, Walter Leigh Rayfield and John Francis Young.

Early life
Peck was born in Hopewell Hill, New Brunswick to a family that had emigrated from New England in 1763.

Peck was 16 years old when his father moved the family to New Westminster, British Columbia. Peck took military training and crossed the Atlantic to join the British Army then changed his mind. He returned to Canada and would volunteer for the Boer War. He was not accepted for duty. He next moved to Klondike, Yukon. When First World War began he was in Prince Rupert, British Columbia and working in a salmon cannery.

First World War 
He went overseas in 1914 as a Major in the 30th Battalion. Then in May 1915 Peck joined as a lieutenant colonel in the 16th (Canadian Scottish) Battalion, Canadian Expeditionary Force. He was 47 years old. He became the commanding officer of the Regiment during the Battle of the Somme (1916). Peck was awarded the Distinguished Service Order (DSO) in the 1917 King's Birthday Honours; a Bar to the DSO, for which the citation in the London Gazette read, "During an attack he showed fine courage and leadership. He led his battalion, under difficulties caused by heavy mist, to its final objective, nearly three miles, after severe fighting. He personally led his men in an attack on nests of machine guns protecting the enemy's guns, which he captured. Some of the guns were of 8-inch calibre."; was Mentioned in Despatches five times; and was wounded twice.

On 2 September 1918 at Cagnicourt, France (the Drocourt-Queant Line), when Lieutenant Colonel Peck's command, after capturing the first objective, was held up by enemy machine-gun fire, he went forward and made a personal reconnaissance under very heavy fire. Returning, he reorganized his battalion and pushed them forward. He then went out, under the most intense artillery and machine-gun fire and intercepted the tanks, giving them the necessary directions, pointing out where they were to make for, and thus paving the way for an infantry battalion to push forward. To this battalion he subsequently gave the necessary support. The full citation was published in a supplement to the London Gazette of 12 November 1918 (dated 15 November 1918):

Politics

In 1917 he was a soldier candidate elected in the khaki election of 1917. He was elected in 1917 as a Unionist for the riding of Skeena. He was defeated in 1921. In 1924, he was elected to the Legislative Assembly of British Columbia for the riding of The Islands. A member of the British Columbia Conservative Party, he was reelected in 1928.

In 1930, the Gulf Islands Ferry Company purchased the Canadian Pacific car ferry Island Princess and renamed it MV Cy Peck in honour of Peck, who was also the local MLA. The MV Cy Peck remained in service until 1966.

Following his political career he was appointed to the Canadian Pension Commission and held this post until 1941.

He died 27 September 1956 of a heart attack and is buried at New Westminster Crematorium, Vancouver, British Columbia, Canada. His Victoria Cross is displayed at the Canadian War Museum in Ottawa, Ontario, Canada.

A plaque inside the House of Commons, Ottawa, Ontario is dedicated to Lieutenant Colonel Cyrus Wesley Peck.

References

 Toronto Public Library Scrapbook, film T6863, volume #14, item 124

External links

 Cyrus Wesley Peck's digitized service file
Cyrus W. Peck fonds, Library and Archives Canada
 The Canadian Scottish Regiment (Princess Mary's) Warrant Officers' and Sergeants' Mess (Lieutenant-Colonel Cyrus Wesley Peck entry)
 News Item (Canadian Scottish Regiment (Princess Mary's) regimental museum VC exhibition)
 
 Legion Magazine-The Magnificent Seven
 Peck's Medals at the Canadian War Museum
 

1871 births
1956 deaths
British Columbia Conservative Party MLAs
Canadian World War I recipients of the Victoria Cross
Members of the House of Commons of Canada from British Columbia
Unionist Party (Canada) MPs
Canadian Expeditionary Force officers
People from Albert County, New Brunswick
Canadian Companions of the Distinguished Service Order
Canadian Scottish Regiment (Princess Mary's)
Canadian Scottish Regiment (Princess Mary's) officers
Canadian military personnel from New Brunswick